Acanthaspis is a genus of assassin bugs. Members of the genus are known to disguise themselves by attaching bits of debris to aid in camouflage.

Partial species list
Acanthaspis alagiriensis Murugan & Livingstone, 1994
Acanthaspis angularis Stål, 1859
Acanthaspis annulicornis Stål, 1874
Acanthaspis apicata Distant, 1903
Acanthaspis biguttula Stål, 1863
Acanthaspis bistillata Stål, 1858
Acanthaspis bombayensis Distant, 1909
Acanthaspis carinata Murugan & Livingstone, 1994
Acanthaspis cincticrus Stål, 1859
Acanthaspis concinnula Stål, 1863
Acanthaspis coprologus (Annandale, 1906)
Acanthaspis coranodes Stål, 1874
Acanthaspis flavipes Stål, 1855
Acanthaspis fulvipes (Dallas, 1850)
Acanthaspis gulo Stål, 1863
Acanthaspis helluo Stål, 1863
Acanthaspis laoensis Distant, 1919
Acanthaspis lineatipes Reuter, 1881
Acanthaspis livingstonei Vennison & Ambrose, 1988
Acanthaspis luteipes Walker, 1873
Acanthaspis maculata Distant, 1910
Acanthaspis megaspila Walker, 1873
Acanthaspis micrographa Walker, 1873
Acanthaspis minutum Livingstone & Murugan, 1988
Acanthaspis nigricans Ambrose, 1994
Acanthaspis nigripes Livingstone & Murugan, 1988
Acanthaspis obscura Stål, 1855
Acanthaspis pedestris Stål, 1863
Acanthaspis pernobilis Reuter, 1881
Acanthaspis petax Stål, 1865
Acanthaspis philomanmariae Vennison & Ambrose, 1988
Acanthaspis pustulata Stål, 1874
Acanthaspis quinquespinosa (Fabricius, 1781)
Acanthaspis rama Distant, 1902
Acanthaspis ruficeps Hsiao, 1976
Acanthaspis rugulosa Stål, 1863
Acanthaspis sexguttata (Fabricius, 1775)
Acanthaspis siruvanii Livingstone & Murugan, 1988
Acanthaspis siva Distant, 1902
Acanthaspis subrufa Distant, 1903
Acanthaspis tavoyana Distant, 1903
Acanthaspis tergeminia Burmeister, 1835
Acanthaspis trimaculata Reuter, 1887
Acanthaspis unifasciata (Wolff, 1804)
Acanthaspis variegata Distant, 1874

References

Reduviidae